Cursing stone may refer to:
 Bullaun, Irish or Scottish hollowed stone
Cursing Stone and Reiver Pavement, public art work in Carlisle, Cumbria, England by Gordon Young